Christy Byrne (born 1971 in County Kildare, Ireland) is a former Irish sportsperson.  He played Gaelic football with his local club Castlemitchell and was a member of the Kildare senior inter-county team from 1994 to 2003.

References

1971 births
Living people
Gaelic football goalkeepers
Kildare inter-county Gaelic footballers